Duncan Hall (born 16 March 1956) is an Australian former rugby union footballer who played for the Australian national rugby team, earning fifteen caps for the Wallabies. His primary positions were Number 8 and 2nd Row.
His post rugby resume includes an impressive list of coaching positions ranging from Super 12 to international teams.
Hall's father, Duncan Hall Sr., was a professional rugby league footballer for Australia, and is considered one of the greatest players of the 20th Century.

Playing career
Hall was a standout athlete at St Joseph's College, Nudgee and made his senior rugby debut with the University of Queensland Rugby Club in 1975, at the age of 19. Between 1975 and 1983, Hall would play in 75 games for Queensland.

In 1979, Hall's reputation playing for Queensland earned him a reserve spot on the Wallabies for Test matches against Ireland and New Zealand, and later a spot on the Wallaby team to tour Argentina.

He made his international debut for Australia as the starting Number 8 in a 22-9 win over Fiji in Suva on 24 May 1980.
In 1982, Hall was named vice captain of the Wallaby squad to tour New Zealand and would go on to captain Australia twice more.

Between 1979 and 1983, Hall would play in a total of 39 matches for Australia, including 15 Test matches, and six Bledisloe Cups.

His final Test match was Australia's 29-7 win over Italy on 22 October 1983. Hall opted to remain in Italy after being dropped from the roster that would play France. After a brief time playing club rugby there, Hall returned to Australia to pursue a career in coaching.

Coaching career
Hall's coaching career began with the Queensland Reds before moving to the UK to take a position with the Leicester Tigers in 1996 as an assistant/forwards coach. After one season with the Tigers, Hall worked his way up the ladder and became the head coach at the Worcester Warriors.

In February 2000, Hall was named the head coach of the USA Rugby team, taking over for Jack Clark who stepped down after the 1999 Rugby World Cup. Hall left the Eagles with a record of 3 wins and 9 losses. He returned home to Australia and became an assistant coach with the NSW Waratahs until 2002.

In 2009, took a forwards coaching position with the Indonesia prior to the start of the Division 3 Asian Five Nations tournament in the Philippines. Hall continued on as head coach for the Rhinos in 2010 and 2011.

Hall took a position as head coach for the United Arab Emirates in January 2012, taking over for Bruce Birtwistle. Three months later the UAE just edged out Katzakatan at the 2012 Asian Five Nations to avoid relegation.

Hall's plans for the growth of the sport within the UAE, due in part to a program targeting national schools and the creation of an all-Emirati Shaheen development side which saw success at the Emirates International Sevens. However, after successes at the national level earlier in his tenure, the Falcons were relegated from the top tier following a 24-8 loss to the Philippines in the 2013 A5N tournament.

Following that defeat, Hall announced his resignation after only 17 months at the helm, citing a desire to return to Australia to reunite with family.

References

Living people
1956 births
Australian rugby union players
Australia international rugby union players
Australian rugby union coaches
United States national rugby union team coaches
Leicester Tigers coaches
Rugby union players from Brisbane
Rugby union number eights